The Peter Smyth House is a historic house at 1629 Crossover Street in Fayetteville, Arkansas.  Built in 1886, it is a regionally rare example of a small stone cottage built in a traditional central hall plan.  The house is built out of coursed sandstone, and has finely-chiseled lintels and sills for the openings.  The front facade is five bays wide, with a center entry flanked by four sash windows.  There two chimneys just inside the outer side walls at the peak of the side gable roof.  A stone ell of antiquity similar to that of the house is attached to the rear; it is uncertain whether it was built as an integral part of the house, or added later.

The house was listed on the National Register of Historic Places in 2002.

See also
National Register of Historic Places listings in Washington County, Arkansas

References

Houses on the National Register of Historic Places in Arkansas
Greek Revival houses in Arkansas
Houses completed in 1886
Houses in Fayetteville, Arkansas
National Register of Historic Places in Fayetteville, Arkansas